The 2011 NCAA Division I Football Championship Game was a postseason college football game between the Delaware Fightin' Blue Hens and the Eastern Washington Eagles. It was played on January 7, 2011, at Pizza Hut Park in Frisco, Texas. The culminating game of the 2010 NCAA Division I FCS football season, it was won by Eastern Washington, 20–19.

This was the first FCS (formerly Division I-AA) title game played in Frisco, after the prior 13 editions had been contested at Finley Stadium in Chattanooga, Tennessee. With the tournament field expanded from 16 to 20 teams, this was also the first time for the title game to be contested in January.

Teams
The participants of the Championship Game were the finalists of the 2010 FCS Playoffs, which began with a 20-team bracket. This was the first season of 20 teams in the tournament field; it had been 16 teams since 1986.

Delaware Fightin' Blue Hens

Delaware finished their regular season with a 9–2 record (6–2 in conference). As the third-seed in the tournament, the Fightin' Blue Hens defeated Lehigh, New Hampshire, and Georgia Southern to reach the final. This was Delaware's fourth appearance in an FCS/Division I-AA title game, having previously won in 2003, and having lost in 1982 and 2007.

Eastern Washington Eagles

Eastern Washington finished their regular season with a 9–2 record (7–1 in conference), with one of their losses coming to Nevada of the FBS. As the fifth-seed in the tournament, the Eagles defeated Southeast Missouri State, North Dakota State, and Villanova to reach the final. This was Eastern Washington's first appearance in an FCS/Division I-AA championship game.

Game summary
Delaware held a 12–0 lead at halftime and had extended their lead to 19–0 with under five minutes remaining in the third quarter, only to see Eastern Washington score three touchdowns in the remainder of the game to win the title, 20–19.

Scoring summary

Game statistics

References

External links
 Box score at ESPN
 Eastern Washington O vs Delaware D 2011 FCS Championship via YouTube
 Eastern Washington D vs Delaware O 2011 FCS Championship via YouTube

Championship Game
NCAA Division I Football Championship Games
Delaware Fightin' Blue Hens football games
Eastern Washington Eagles football games
American football in the Dallas–Fort Worth metroplex
Sports in Frisco, Texas
NCAA Division I Football Championship Game
NCAA Division I Football Championship Game